Al-Oruba Club Stadium is a multi-use stadium in Sakakah, Saudi Arabia. It is currently used mostly for football matches, on club level by Al-Orobah F.C. of the Saudi Professional League. The stadium has a capacity of 8,000.

External links
Goalzz.com

Sports venues in Saudi Arabia